The 1995 BC Lions finished in third place in the North Division with a 10–8 record. They appeared in the North semi-final but were defeated by the Edmonton Eskimos, denying the team a chance to defend their Grey Cup title.

Offseason

CFL Draft

Preseason

Regular season

Season standings

Season schedule

Awards and records

1995 CFL All-Stars
OG – Jamie Taras, CFL All-Star

Northern All-Star selections
RB – Cory Philpot, CFL Northern All-Star
OG – Jamie Taras, CFL Northern All-Star
OT – Vic Stevenson, CFL Northern All-Star
DE – Andrew Stewart, CFL Northern All-Star  
DS – Tom Europe, CFL Northern All-Star

Playoffs

North semi-final

References

BC Lions seasons
Bc Lions Season, 1995
1995 in British Columbia